Craig Edward Harline is a professor of history at Brigham Young University (BYU) and an author of several books. His research has focused on lived religion during the Reformation.

Biography 
Harline was raised in a LDS family with seven siblings in Fresno, California. He served as a missionary in Belgium in the 1970s, where he developed his interests in European history.

Harline earned a B.A. from Brigham Young University in 1980; a M.A. (1984) and Ph.D. (1986) from Rutgers University. He held teaching positions at Rutgers and the University of Idaho, before he began at BYU in 1992.

In 2017 Harline was appointed to De Lamar Jensen Professorship of Early Modern History, the first endowed named chair to be established in the BYU history department.

Writings 
Pamphlets, Printing, and Political Culture in the Early Dutch Republic (Dordrecht; Boston: M. Nijhoff, 1987)
Rhyme and Reason of Politics in Early Modern Europe: Collected Essays of Herbert H. Rowen (Dordrecht; Boston: Kluwer Academic Publishers, 1992)
The Burdens of Sister Margaret: Inside a Seventeenth-Century Convent (New York: Doubleday, 1994; abridged paperback, Yale University Press, Nota Bene Series, 2000)
A Bishop's Tale: Mathias Hovius Among his Flock in Seventeenth-Century Flanders, with Eddy Put (New Haven and London: Yale University Press, 2000; paperback, 2002)
Miracles at the Jesus Oak: Histories of the Supernatural in Reformation Europe (New York: Doubleday, 2003; paperback, Yale University Press, 2011)
Sunday: A History of the First Day from Babylonia to the Super Bowl (New York: Doubleday, 2007; paperback, 2011)
Conversions: Two Family Stories from the Reformation and Modern America (New Haven: Yale University Press, 2011)
Way Below the Angels: The Pretty Clearly Troubled But Not Even Close to Tragic Confessions of a Real Live Mormon Missionary (Grand Rapids: Wm. B. Eerdmans, 2014). 
Jacobs Vlucht: een familiesaga van de Gouden Eeuw (in Dutch, [Jacob's Flight: A Family Saga of the Golden Age]; Nijmegen, the Netherlands: Vantilt, 2016)
A World Ablaze: The Rise of Martin Luther and the Birth of the Reformation (Oxford University Press, 3 October 2017)

References

External links 
 Craig Harline's official website
 Faculty page at BYU's History site
 Craig Harline on Eerdmans Author Interview Series about Way Below the Angels, at YouTube
 418: Conversions: Two Family Stories from the Reformation and Modern America with Craig Harline, interview on Mormon Stories Podcast (15 May 2013)
 33: Way Below The Angels, interview on Rational Faiths Podcast (16 November 2014)

Living people
American Mormon missionaries in Belgium
20th-century Mormon missionaries
Brigham Young University alumni
Rutgers University alumni
Brigham Young University faculty
Writers from Provo, Utah
Writers from Fresno, California
20th-century American historians
American male non-fiction writers
21st-century American historians
21st-century American male writers
American memoirists
American historians of religion
Historians of Christianity
Reformation historians
Historians of the Netherlands
Latter Day Saints from California
Latter Day Saints from New Jersey
Latter Day Saints from Idaho
Latter Day Saints from Utah
Year of birth missing (living people)
20th-century American male writers